Teófilo Toda (born 18 June 1935) is a former Peruvian cyclist. He competed in the individual road race at the 1964 Summer Olympics.

References

External links
 

1935 births
Living people
Peruvian male cyclists
Olympic cyclists of Peru
Cyclists at the 1964 Summer Olympics
Place of birth missing (living people)
20th-century Peruvian people